Rhopalocarpus alternifolius is a tree in the family Sphaerosepalaceae. It is endemic to Madagascar.

Distribution and habitat
Rhopalocarpus alternifolius is known only from populations in the northern and northeastern regions of Diana, Sava, Alaotra Mangoro, Analanjirofo and Atsinanana. Its habitat is humid evergreen and dry deciduous forests from sea-level to  altitude. Some populations are within protected areas.

Threats
Rhopalocarpus alternifolius is threatened by shifting patterns of agriculture. Because the species is used as timber, subsistence harvesting is also a threat.

References

alternifolius
Endemic flora of Madagascar
Trees of Madagascar
Plants described in 1884
Taxa named by John Gilbert Baker
Taxa named by René Paul Raymond Capuron